The Saint Seiya anime (also known as Knights of the Zodiac), based on the manga series of the same name by Masami Kurumada, was produced by Toei Animation. It first premiered on Japan's TV Asahi on October 11, 1986, and continued on until April 1, 1989. It was directed first by Kōzō Morishita (episodes 1–73) and then by Kazuhito Kikuchi (74–114). The character designers were Shingo Araki and Michi Himeno. Seiji Yokoyama composed the soundtrack. The chief scriptwriters were Takao Koyama (1–73) and Yoshiyuki Suga (74–114).

The anime is divided into arcs, similarly to Kurumada's original manga. The first is the "Sanctuary arc" (divided into four sub arcs), which starts on episode 1 and ends on episode 73, followed by the "Asgard arc" (episodes 74–99). The Asgard storyline did not exist in the manga and was created especially for the anime. The third arc, the "Poseidon arc" (episodes 100–114), concluded the anime, leaving the final part of the manga without an animated adaptation.

It was not until 2002 that the "Hades arc", the finale to Kurumada's manga, was adapted into an original video animation (OVA) series. The project was divided into three chapters – "Sanctuary", "Inferno" and "Elysion" – spanning a total of 31 episodes. The first chapter was directed by Shigeyasu Yamauchi and scripted by Michiko Yokote. It was broadcast on Animax, a Japanese pay-per-view channel, from November 9, 2002, to April 12, 2003, and later released on DVD in 2003. The second chapter was divided into two parts. The first was directed by Tomoharu Katsumata and scripted by Yosuke Kuroda. The first episodes were released from December 17, 2005, to February 18, 2006. The DVD compilation was released in the same year. The second part of the second chapter was released on Japan's SKY PerfecTV! from December 15, 2006, to March 1, 2007. The third and final chapter was released from March 7 to August 1, 2008.

There have also been a number of theatrical releases, which do not belong to the regular chronology of the series, as they contradict its storyline on several occasions. The films are titled Evil Goddess Eris, The Heated Battle of the Gods, The Legend of the Crimson Youth, Warriors of the Last Holy War and Heaven Chapter Overture. The latest was a 3D CG animation released on June 21, 2014, titled Saint Seiya: Legend of Sanctuary.

In North America, the Saint Seiya anime was licensed to DIC Entertainment, while the home video rights were licensed to ADV Films. Two English dubs were produced. One, an edited dub produced in Toronto, Canada, by DIC, was renamed Knights of the Zodiac, and was broadcast on Cartoon Network in 2003. This dub lasted for 40 episodes on YTV and 32 on Cartoon Network and the first 28 episodes were released to VHS and DVD by ADV Kids. The other dub, produced by ADV Films in Houston, Texas, was fully uncut and lasted for 60 episodes. It retained the original Saint Seiya name. It was released to bilingual DVD from ADV Films, but production ceased when Knights of the Zodiac was canceled on Cartoon Network. In 2009, ADV's interest in Saint Seiya was renewed (combining with ADV possibly licensing the overall rights to the series as opposed to just the Home Video rights) and they re-released their uncut episodes to DVD in boxset format, with plans to release more. Production, however, was once again ceased due to ADV's financial troubles.

A DVD set from New Video, containing 11 discs and the first 73 episodes (marking episodes 61–73's debut in English), titled Saint Seiya: Sanctuary Classic Complete Collection was released in North America on April 15, 2014. The collection contains Japanese audio with English subtitles. In 2019, the first 4 seasons were released on Netflix featuring a brand new English dub from Sentai Filmworks with seasons 5 and 6 being released in 2020.

Series overview

Episode list

Season 1 (1986)

Season 2 (1987)

Season 3 (1987)

Season 4 (1987–88)

Season 5 (1988)

Season 6 (1988–89)

Hades OVA list
The first thirteen episodes of the OVA series corresponding to the "Hades saga" of the manga were broadcast on Animax (a Japanese pay-per-view channel) from November 2002 to April 2003, and then released on DVD during the year 2003. These thirteen episodes, named , were directed by Shigeyasu Yamauchi, still with character designs by Shingo Araki and Michi Himeno, while the scripts were adapted from the manga by Michiko Yokote. The soundtrack was entirely taken from Yokoyama's work on the previous TV series.

Two years after the first chapter of the "Hades saga", a second chapter was produced in 2005, continuing the adaptation of the manga into anime. This second chapter was named  and consisted of six episodes. Toei Animation released the first two OVAs on the same Animax channel, on December 17, 2005, followed by the next two on January 21, 2006. The last pair were released on February 18, 2006. Shortly after their TV broadcasting, the episodes were released on DVD in 2006. This chapter was directed by Tomoharu Katsumata, again with character designs by Shingo Araki and Michi Himeno. The scripts were done by Yosuke Kuroda and the soundtrack, by Yokoyama, included tracks from the TV series of 1986 and two new tracks.

Several of the original voice actors reprised their roles in the Sanctuary chapter, but starting with the Inferno chapter, many of them were replaced by new voice actors. For example, Masakazu Morita replaced Toru Furuya as the voice of Pegasus Seiya, Yūta Kasuya replaced Ryo Horikawa as the voice of Andromeda Shun, Hiroaki Miura replaced Koichi Hashimoto as the voice of Cygnus Hyōga, Katsuyuki Konishi replaced Hideyuki Hori as Phoenix Ikki, Takahiro Sakurai replaced Hirotaka Suzuoki as the voice of Dragon Shiryū and Fumiko Orikasa replaced Keiko Han as the voice of Saori Kido/Athena. Hideyuki Tanaka, however, reprised his role as the narrator.

On July 4, 2006, the newly published fifteenth volume of the Saint Seiya Japan Complete Version manga brought the news that production of  had begun. Toei Animation officially announced the news on its website on July 18, 2006. Hades: Chapter Inferno Part 2, which consisted of six episodes, was released on Japan's SKY PerfecTV!. The first two episodes were available from December 15, 2006, to January 4, 2007; the third and fourth episodes from January 19, 2007, to February 1, 2007; and the last two from February 16, 2007, to March 1, 2007.

The final chapter of the OVA series, was released on March 7 (episodes 26 and 27), May 2 (28 and 29), and August 1, 2008 (30 and 31).

Chapter 1: Sanctuary (2002–03)
T = Total series episode number, H = Hades OVA episode number

Chapter 2: Inferno (2005–07)

Part 1

Part 2

Chapter 3: Elysium (2008)

Notes

Translations

References

Saint Seiya
Toei Animation original video animation